The Devil Makes Three is an Americana band from Santa Cruz, California, United States. The group blends bluegrass, old time, country, folk, blues, jazz, and ragtime music. The group's members are guitarist Pete Bernhard, upright bassist Lucia Turino, and guitarist and tenor banjo player Cooper McBean.

Career
The band has released six full-length albums.  They independently released a self-titled album in 2002.  Another independent release followed in 2004, Longjohns, Boots, And A Belt.  The band recorded two shows in April 2006 in Felton, California with guest fiddler Chojo Jacques.  The recordings were later released as a live album, A Little Bit Faster And A Little Bit Worse.

After the release of their live album, the band signed with independent label Milan Records, which specializes in film scores and soundtracks.  Their first album on Milan was a re-release of their debut album, The Devil Makes Three.  In 2009, they followed with an all-new album, Do Wrong Right.

Band member Bernhard independently released a solo album, Things I Left Behind (2006).  In September 2009 Bernhard released his next solo album, Straight Line, on Milan Records.

McBean and Bernhard are originally from near Brattleboro, Vermont, where they played music together as childhood friends and when they were in high school.  They were also acquainted with Turino (from New Hampshire but raised in Vermont), but didn't know her well.  After graduating from high school, all three moved to California separately, Bernhard by way of Nashville.  Bernhard and McBean re-connected in Olympia.  Later in Santa Cruz they also became reacquainted with Turino, forming the band soon after in 2001.  Before forming The Devil Makes Three with Turino, both Bernhard and McBean played in punk bands and later toured as a duo.

Around 2010, Bernhard and Turino moved back to Brattleboro. McBean remained in California and later moved to Austin. Despite no longer living in the same town, the band continues to tour and write.

In August 2010, the band performed at Outside Lands Music and Arts Festival. They have also performed several times at the annual Hardly Strictly Bluegrass Festival.

On June 4, 2018, The Devil Makes Three announced their new studio album, Chains Are Broken, which was produced by Ted Hutt and released on August 24, 2018, via New West Records. Along with the album announcement, they released "Paint My Face" as a streaming single and released another album track, "Bad Idea", on July 13, 2018.

Discography

Albums

Music videos

References

External links
 
[ Allmusic] artist page

American folk musical groups
American bluegrass music groups
Americana music groups
Country music groups from California
Musical groups from California
Musical groups established in 2002
2002 establishments in California
Santa Cruz, California